Thomas J. Coyne (December 10, 1954April 12, 2017) was an American mastering engineer.

Early life and career
Coyne was born in Elizabeth, New Jersey, and grew up in nearby Union, where he graduated from Roselle Catholic High School in 1972. He attended Kean College where he received a degree in Commercial Design. Following college, Coyne's first job was at Dick Charles Recording where Lee Hulko, former owner of Sterling Sound, got his first job in the states after arriving from Thunder Bay, Ontario. In the six months Coyne worked at Dick Charles, he watched Dick master records on the lathe and soon began cutting his own after hours. Coyne then was hired at Frankford/Wayne Mastering Labs, assisting under Dominic Romeo, known for cutting 45s for The Rolling Stones, The Four Seasons, Frankie Valli and Dionne Warwick among others. For the next ten years, Coyne primarily cut records for dance bands with his first big record being "Ladies Night" by Kool & the Gang. In 1989, Coyne was hired by The Hit Factory where he spent another five years mastering mostly Hip-Hop and R&B records by artists such as Black Box, Billy Ocean, A Tribe Called Quest and De La Soul. In 1994, Coyne was offered a job by Lee Hulko who now operated Sterling Sound. In 1998, Coyne, Ted Jensen, Greg Calbi, Murat Aktar (Absolute Audio co-founder) and the UK based Metropolis bought Sterling Sound from Lee Hulko.

Death 
Coyne died on April 12, 2017, from multiple myeloma at the age of 62.

Awards and recognition

During his career, Coyne won ten Grammy Awards and one Latin Grammy Award and had over 35 category nominations.

Grammy Awards

|-
|rowspan="1"|2010
|I Am... Sasha Fierce
|rowspan="2"| Album of the Year
| 
|-
|rowspan="1"|2012
|21
| 
|-
|rowspan="1"|2013
|"We Are Never Ever Getting Back Together"
| Record of the Year
| 
|-
|rowspan="2"|2014
|The Heist
|rowspan="4"| Album of the Year
| 
|-
|Red
| 
|-
|rowspan="4"|2015
|Beyoncé
| 
|-
|In the Lonely Hour
| 
|-
|"Stay with Me (Darkchild Version)"
|rowspan="5"| Record of the Year
| 
|-
|"Shake It Off"
| 
|-
|rowspan="5"|2016
|"Uptown Funk" 
| 
|-
|"Blank Space"
| 
|-
|"Can't Feel My Face" 
| 
|-
|1989 
|rowspan="4"| Album of the Year
| 
|-
|Beauty Behind the Madness
| 
|-
|rowspan="4"|2017
|25
| 
|-
|Purpose
| 
|-
|"Hello"
|rowspan="3"| Record of the Year
| 
|-
|"7 Years"
| 
|-
|rowspan="3"|2018
|"24K Magic"
| 
|-
|rowspan="2"|24K Magic
| Album of the Year
| 
|-
|rowspan="2"| Best Engineered Album, Non-Classical
| 
|-
|rowspan="1"|2019
|Colors
|

Latin Grammy Awards

|-
|rowspan="1"|2009
|Ciclos
|rowspan="4"| Album of the Year
| 
|-
|rowspan="2"|2012
|Independiente
| 
|-
|Déjenme Llorar
|
|-
|rowspan="2"|2013
|Corazón Profundo
| 
|-
|"Vivir Mi Vida"
| Record of the Year
| 
|-
|rowspan="2"|2014
|3.0
|rowspan="5"| Album of the Year
| 
|-
|Más Corazón Profundo
| 
|-
|rowspan="2"|2015
|Creo en Mí
| 
|-
|Sirope
| 
|-
|rowspan="2"|2016
|Conexión
| 
|-
|"Duele el Corazón"
| Record of the Year
|

Studio

Sterling Sound is located in New York City, occupying the top floor of the Chelsea Market in the Meatpacking District. It was designed by Fran Manzella, FM Design.

List of works mastered by Tom Coyne

1970s

1979 - Music Box Dancer - Frank Mills
1979 - Delores Hall - Delores Hall
1979 - I'm Caught Up (In a One Night Love Affair) - Inner Life
1979 - Come Into My Life - Carol Douglas
1979 - Ladies' Night - Kool & the Gang
1978 - What About You! - Stanley Turrentine
1978 - Take a Look at Those Cakes - James Brown

1980s

1989 - Beneath the Remains - Sepultura
1989 - Bayou Cadillac - BeauSoleil
1989 - Flag - Yello
1988 - I Remember Blind Joe Death - John Fahey
1988 - Life Is...Too Short - Too Short
1988 - Staring at the Sun - Level 42
1988 - Power Metal - Pantera
1987 - Liberty and Justice For... - Agnostic Front
1987 - Buster Poindexter - Buster Poindexter
1987 - Earth, Sun, Moon - Love and Rockets
1987 - Running in the Family - Level 42
1987 - Taking Over - Overkill
1986 - Standing in the Light - Level 42
1986 - Animalization - The Animals
1986 - Game Over - Nuclear Assault
1986 - The Pink Opaque - Cocteau Twins
1986 - After Dark - Johnny Adams
1986 - Unveiling the Wicked - Exciter
1986 - Atomizer - Big Black
1986 - Dancing on the Edge - Roy Buchanan
1986 - Bayou Boogie - BeauSoleil
1986 - True Colours - Level 42
1985 - Hellish Crossfire - Iron Angel
1985 - I Am the Night - Pantera
1985 - Nail - Foetus
1985 - Skeptics Apocalypse - Agent Steel
1985 - Long Live the Loud - Exciter
1985 - Gotta Let This Hen Out! - Robyn Hitchcock and the Egyptians
1985 - World Machine - Level 42
1985 - Hello Central...Give Me Dr. Jazz - Bob Brozman
1985 - Open the Door - Pentangle
1985 - Haven't You Heard - Paul Laurence
1985 - Deckchairs Overboard - Deckchairs Overboard
1985 - Standing in the Line of Fire - Gary U.S. Bonds
1985 - Showdown! - Albert Collins, Robert Cray & Johnny Copeland
1985 - Queen of the Blues - Koko Taylor
1985 - When a Guitar Plays the Blues - Roy Buchanan
1985 - Pressure Cooker - Clarence "Gatemouth" Brown
1984 - How We Rock - SSD
1984 - King of the World - Mighty Sparrow
1984 - Ride the Lightning - Metallica
1984 - Escape - Whodini
1984 - Commercial Zone - Public Image Ltd
1984 - Guitar Slinger - Johnny Winter
1984 - City Babys Revenge - Charged GBH
1984 - How Men Are - Heaven 17
1984 - Burning Star - Helstar
1984 - Suddenly - Billy Ocean
1984 - From the Heart - Johnny Adams
1984 - Doot-Doot - Freur
1984 - Jealousy - Touchstone
1984 - Don't Break the Oath - Mercyful Fate
1983 - Hittin' the Road Again - Red Holloway
1983 - Mongo Magic - Mongo Santamaría
1983 - High-Rise - Ashford & Simpson
1983 - Bar Room Preacher - Jimmy Johnson
1983 - Listen - A Flock of Seagulls
1983 - Land of the Lost - The Freeze
1983 - Live - The Rods
1983 - Check It! - Mutabaruka
1982 - Midnight Blue - Louise Tucker
1982 - A Flock of Seagulls - A Flock of Seagulls
1982 - Miscellaneous Abstract Record No. 1 - Rosalie Sorrels
1982 - November Group - November Group
1981 - Something Special - Kool & the Gang
1981 - What a Woman Needs - Melba Moore
1980 - Celebrate! - Kool & the Gang
1980 - National Lampoon White Album - National Lampoon

1990s

1999 - Walking Off the Buzz - Blessid Union of Souls
1999 - A Prince Among Thieves - Prince Paul
1999 - There’s a Poison Goin’ On - Public Enemy
1999 - Vol. 3... Life and Times of S. Carter - Jay Z
1999 - Beneath the Surface - GZA
1999 - Chyna Doll - Foxy Brown
1999 - Coming of Age - Memphis Bleek
1999 - ...Baby One More Time - Britney Spears
1999 - Venni Vetti Vecci - Ja Rule
1999 - Millennium - Backstreet Boys 
1999 - Imajin - Imajin 
1998 - Bobby Digital in Stereo - RZA 
1998 - Dearest Christian, I'm So Very Sorry for Bringing You Here. Love, Dad - P.M. Dawn 
1998 - Embrya - Maxwell 
1998 - The Love Movement - A Tribe Called Quest 
1998 - Foundation - Brand Nubian 
1998 - E.L.E. (Extinction Level Event): The Final World Front - Busta Rhymes 
1998 - Soul Survivor - Pete Rock 
1998 - Make It Reign - Lord Tariq and Peter Gunz 
1998 - Last Time Around: Live at Legends - Buddy Guy

1997 - That's Them - Artifacts
1997 - The Black Bossalini - Spice 1
1997 - Get Some - Snot
1997 - When Disaster Strikes... - Busta Rhymes
1997 - Da Dirty 30 - Cru
1997 - Forever - Bobby Brown
1997 - Jock Jams, Volume 3 - Various Artists
1997 - Backstreet's Back - Backstreet Boys
1997 - Phenomenon - LL Cool J
1997 - Love Always - K-Ci & JoJo
1997 - Live - Erykah Badu
1997 - The Pick, the Sickle and the Shovel - Gravediggaz
1997 - Long Time No See - Chico DeBarge
1997 - One Day It'll All Make Sense - Common
1997 - The Mix Tape, Vol. II - Funkmaster Flex
1997 - Holonic-The Self Megamix - DJ Krush
1997 - God Sound - Boogiemonsters
1997 - Wu-Tang Forever - Wu-Tang Clan
1997 - Solid HarmoniE - Solid HarmoniE
1997 - Scout's Honor… by Way of Blood - Rampage
1997 - Salisbury - Uriah Heep
1997 - All That I Am - Joe
1997 - Chupacabra - Imani Coppola
1997 - Paradisiaque - MC Solaar
1997 - Dangerous Ground - Various Artists
1996 - I Am L.V. - L.V.
1996 - Backstreet Boys - Backstreet Boys
1996 - Gravity - Da Bush Babees
1996 - High School High - Various Artists
1996 - Off Parole - Rappin' 4-Tay
1996 - All Frames of the Game - Playaz Tryna Strive
1996 - Maxwell's Urban Hang Suite - Maxwell
1996 - Here to Save You All - Chino XL
1996 - Beats, Rhymes and Life - A Tribe Called Quest
1996 - It Was Written - Nas
1996 - Wild Cowboys - Sadat X
1996 - From Where??? - Skillz
1996 - Gettin' It (Album Number Ten) - Too Short
1996 - The Nutty Professor - Various Artists
1996 - Takin' Mine - Heather B.
1996 - Sa-Deuce - Sa-Deuce
1996 - Autobiography of Mistachuck - Chuck D
1996 - Ill Na Na - Foxy Brown
1996 - Realms 'n Reality - Cella Dwellas
1996 - Illadelph Halflife - The Roots
1996 - Red Hot + Rio - Various Artists
1996 - Stakes Is High - De La Soul
1996 - Time Will Reveal - Above the Law
1996 - Peace Beyond Passion - Meshell Ndegeocello
1996 - The Hemp Museum - B-Legit
1996 - The Coming - Busta Rhymes
1996 - Tha Hall of Game - E-40
1995 - Mr. Smith - LL Cool J
1995 - 2000 - Grand Puba
1995 - The Awakening - Lord Finesse
1995 - Only Built 4 Cuban Linx... - Raekwon
1995 - Game Related - The Click
1995 - The Show - Various Artists
1995 - 1990-Sick - Spice 1
1995 - Liquid Swords - GZA
1995 - World Ultimate - The Nonce
1995 - Prophecy - Capleton
1995 - People Who Fell from the Sky - Mind Funk
1995 - Mind of Mystikal - Mystikal
1995 - No Man's Land - Souls of Mischief
1995 - Cocktails - Too Short
1995 - Return to the 36 Chambers: The Dirty Version - Ol' Dirty Bastard
1995 - New Jersey Drive, Vol. 1 - Various Artists
1994 - Creep wit' Me - Ill Al Skratch
1994 - [[Keep the Fire Burnin' (Dan Hartman album)|Keep the Fire Burnin''']] - Dan Hartman
1994 - Muse Sick-n-Hour Mess Age - Public Enemy
1994 - Fear Itself - Casual
1994 - Promise - Sade
1994 - Blowout Comb - Digable Planets
1994 - Do You Want More?!!!??! - The Roots
1994 - Ambushed - Da Bush Babees
1994 - Ring - The Connells
1994 - A Low Down Dirty Shame - Various Artists
1994 - From the Ground Up - The Roots
1994 - Between a Rock and a Hard Place - Artifacts
1994 - Super Tight - UGK
1994 - Age Ain't Nothing but a Number - Aaliyah
1994 - Prose Combat - MC Solaar
1994 - Subliminal Simulation - Dream Warriors
1994 - Same as It Ever Was - House of Pain
1994 - The Big Badass - Ant Banks
1993 - Plantation Lullabies - Meshell Ndegeocello
1993 - Supermodel of the World - RuPaul
1993 - 93 'til Infinity - Souls of Mischief
1993 - Reachin' (A New Refutation of Time and Space) - Digable Planets
1993 - Buhloone Mindstate - De La Soul
1993 - I Hear Black - Overkill
1993 - Prototype - Varga
1993 - Menace II Society - Various Artists
1993 - Midnight Marauders - A Tribe Called Quest
1993 - Time to Move On - Billy Ocean
1993 - 12 Play - R. Kelly
1993 - T.I.M.E. (The Inner Mind's Eye) - Leaders of the New School
1993 - Get in Where You Fit In - Too Short
1993 - Faithful - Hi-Five
1993 - Code Red - DJ Jazzy Jeff & The Fresh Prince
1993 - The Polyfuze Method - Kid Rock
1993 - Here Come the Lords - Lords of the Underground
1992 - Sex and Violence - Boogie Down Productions
1992 - F.U. Don't Take It Personal - Fu-Schnickens
1992 - In God We Trust - Brand Nubian
1992 - Shorty the Pimp - Too Short
1992 - Love Deluxe - Sade
1992 - Keep It Goin' On - Hi-Five
1992 - House of Pain - House of Pain
1992 - Too Hard to Swallow - UGK
1991 - Homebase - DJ Jazzy Jeff & The Fresh Prince
1991 - The Low End Theory - A Tribe Called Quest
1991 - Live Hardcore Worldwide - Boogie Down Productions
1991 - Funke, Funke Wisdom - Kool Moe Dee
1991 - A Wolf in Sheep's Clothing - Black Sheep
1991 - Nature of a Sista - Queen Latifah
1991 - De La Soul Is Dead - De La Soul
1990 - Grits Sandwiches for Breakfast - Kid Rock
1990 - People's Instinctive Travels and the Paths of Rhythm - A Tribe Called Quest
1990 - Into Darkness - Winter
1990 - By Inheritance - Artillery
1990 - Edutainment - Boogie Down Productions
1990 - Jump for Joy - Koko Taylor
1990 - Sex Packets - Digital Underground
1990 - Deicide - Deicide

2000s

2009 - BLACKsummers'night - Maxwell
2009 - Viva Ai - Ai
2009 - Sound Awake - Karnivool
2009 - In the Mood for Life - Wax Tailor
2008 - I Am... Sasha Fierce - Beyoncé
2008 - Funhouse - P!nk
2008 - Circus - Britney Spears
2007 - Blackout - Britney Spears
2007 - Hope & Sorrow - Wax Tailor
2007 - Don't Stop Ai - Ai
2007 - Elliott Yamin - Elliott Yamin
2007 - Introducing Joss Stone - Joss Stone
2006 - What's Goin' On Ai - Ai
2006 - Verónica Orozco - Verónica Orozco
2006 - I'm Not Dead - P!nk
2005 - Mic-a-holic Ai - Ai
2004 - Patience - George Michael
2004 - On the 6/J.Lo - Jennifer Lopez
2004 - Lose My Breath/Soldier - Destiny's Child
2003 - Frank - Amy Winehouse
2003 - Dangerously in Love - Beyoncé
2003 - In the Zone - Britney Spears
2002 - X - Def Leppard
2002 - Details - Frou Frou
2001 - Now - Maxwell
2001 - Survivor - Destiny's Child
2001 - Mandy Moore - Mandy Moore
2001 - O-Town - O-Town
2001 - Sol Invictus - Akhenaton
2001 - Willa Was Here - Willa Ford
2001 - Ghetto Fabulous - Mystikal
2001 - Genesis - Busta Rhymes
2001 - AOI: Bionix - De La Soul
2001 - Crown Royal - Run–D.M.C.
2001 - Better Days - Joe
2001 - Nivea - Nivea
2001 - Britney - Britney Spears
2001 - Embrace the Chaos - Ozomatli
2001 - All Rise - Blue
2001 - Tarantula - Mystikal
2001 - I Told You So - Chino XL
2000 - Mama's Gun - Erykah Badu
2000 - Lover's Rock - Sade
2000 - Like Water for Chocolate - Common
2000 - The Platform - Dilated Peoples
2000 - No Angel - Dido
2000 - Human Nature - Human Nature
2000 - Late for the Future - Galactic
2000 - Oops!... I Did It Again - Britney Spears
2000 - Yeeeah Baby - Big Pun
2000 - More - Vitamin C
2000 - Bridging the Gap - The Black Eyed Peas
2000 - Fear of Flying - Mýa
2000 - Guru's Jazzmatazz, Vol. 3: Streetsoul - Guru
2000 - Art Official Intelligence: Mosaic Thump - De La Soul
2000 - My Name Is Joe - Joe
2000 - G.O.A.T. - LL Cool J
2000 - Art and Life - Beenie Man
2000 - Rule 3:36 - Ja Rule
2000 - Black & Blue - Backstreet Boys
2000 - Voodoo - D'Angelo

2010s

2017 - Wa to Yo - Ai
2017 - Cayendo - Nicole Pernigotti 
2017 - Time in a Vacuum - Franzone
2017 - Confusion - Fase39
2017 - Speak to Me - Amy Lee
2017 - Gang Signs & Prayer - Stormzy 
2017 - The Valley - Betty Who
2017 - Fifty Shades Darker [Original Motion Picture Soundtrack] - Danny Elfman
2017 - Dear Evan Hansen:  Original Broadway Cast Recording - Benj Pasek / Justin Paul 
2017 - Believer (single) - Imagine Dragons
2017 - Thankful - New Kids on the Block
2017 - Animal World 動物世界 - Joker Xue 薛之謙
2016 - And the Anonymous Nobody... - De La Soul
2016 - Dangerous Woman - Ariana Grande
2016 - Crazy Girl - Jordan White
2016 - 24K Magic - Bruno Mars
2016 - Boxes - Goo Goo Dolls
2016 - Ripcord - Keith Urban
2016 - Joanne - Lady Gaga
2016 - Starboy - The Weeknd
2016 - Sit Still, Look Pretty - Daya
2016 - Glory Days - Little Mix
2016 - Dream Machine - Tokio Hotel
2016 - Lady Wood - Tove Lo
2016 - "How To Be A Human Being" - Glass Animals 
2016 - Fantôme - Hikaru Utada
2016 - Made - BIGBANG
2016 - Selamanya Cinta - Shila Amzah featuring Alif Satar
2016 - My Journey - Shila Amzah 
2015 - 25 - Adele
2015 - Hamilton (Broadway Cast Recording) 
2015 - Lesser Oceans - Fences
2015 - Daya - Daya
2015 - The Bass Bass (Trail Mix) - Franzone
2015 - Piece of Music - Franzone
2015 - Uptown Special - Mark Ronson
2015 - Confident - Demi Lovato
2014 - 1989 - Taylor Swift
2014 - Rose ave. - You+Me
2014 - Four - One Direction 
2014 - Sex and Love - Enrique Iglesias
2014 - Sweet Talker - Jessie J
2014 - Trail - Franzone
2014 - My Everything - Ariana Grande
2014 - In the Lonely Hour - Sam Smith
2014 - The London Sessions - Mary J. Blige
2014 - Rise - Taeyang
2013 - Moriagaro - Ai
2013 - In limine - Silvia Tancredi
2013 - 3.0 - Marc Anthony
2013 - Super Best Records: 15th Celebration - Misia
2013 - BEYONCÉ - Beyoncé 
2013 - Avril Lavigne - Avril Lavigne
2013 - Midnight Memories - One Direction
2012 - The Truth About Love - P!nk
2012 - The Heist - Macklemore and Ryan Lewis
2012 - Overexposed - Maroon 5
2012 - Independent - Ai
2012 - Looking 4 Myself - Usher
2012 - Red - Taylor Swift
2012 - Songs of the Third and Fifth - The Mark of Cain
2011 - 21 - Adele
2010 - Body Talk - Robyn
2010 - This Is the Warning'' - Dead Letter Circus
2010 - "Mr. Saxobeat" - Alexandra Stan

References

1954 births
2017 deaths
Deaths from multiple myeloma
Grammy Award winners
Latin Grammy Award winners
Mastering engineers
People from Elizabeth, New Jersey
People from Union Township, Union County, New Jersey
Kean University alumni
Roselle Catholic High School alumni
Deaths from cancer in the United States